E3 ubiquitin-protein ligase FANCL is an enzyme that in humans is encoded by the FANCL gene.

Function 

The clinical phenotype of mutational defects in all Fanconi anemia (FA) complementation groups is similar.  This phenotype is characterized by progressive bone marrow failure, cancer proneness and typical birth defects.  The main cellular phenotype is hypersensitivity to DNA damage, particularly inter-strand DNA crosslinks.  The FA proteins interact through a multi-protein pathway.  DNA interstrand crosslinks are highly deleterious damages that are repaired by homologous recombination involving coordination of FA proteins and breast cancer susceptibility gene 1 (BRCA1).

The Fanconi Anemia (FA) DNA repair pathway is essential for the recognition and repair of DNA interstrand crosslinks (ICL).  A critical step in the pathway is the monoubiquitination of FANCD2 by the RING E3 ligase FANCL. FANCL comprises 3 domains, a RING domain that interacts with E2 conjugating enzymes, a central domain required for substrate interaction, and an N-terminal E2-like fold (ELF) domain that interacts with FANCB. The ELF domain of FANCL is also required to mediate a non-covalent interaction
between FANCL and ubiquitin. The ELF domain is required to promote efficient DNA damage-induced FANCD2 monoubiquitination in vertebrate cells, suggesting an important function of FANCB and ubiquitin binding by FANCL in vivo.

A nuclear complex containing FANCL (as well as FANCA, FANCB, FANCC, FANCE, FANCF, FANCG and FANCM) is essential for the activation of the FANCD2 protein to the mono-ubiquitinated isoform.  In normal, non-mutant, cells FANCD2 is mono-ubiquinated in response to DNA damage.  Activated FANCD2 protein co-localizes with BRCA1 (breast cancer susceptibility protein) at ionizing radiation-induced foci and in synaptonemal complexes of meiotic chromosomes (see Figure: Recombinational repair of double strand damage).

References

Further reading